Waresat Hussain Belal is a Bangladesh Awami League politician and the incumbent Member of Parliament from Netrokona-5.

Early life
Belal was born on 1 September 1958. He graduated with a H.S.C. degree. He fought in the Bangladesh Liberation war and was awarded the gallantry award Bir Protik.

Career
Belal was elected to Parliament in 2014 from Netrokona-5 as a candidate of Bangladesh Awami League. On 15 August 2018, a rally organized by him broke into fights between different fractions of Bangladesh Awami League.

References

Awami League politicians
Living people
1958 births
10th Jatiya Sangsad members
11th Jatiya Sangsad members
Mukti Bahini personnel